The BENE-League Handball 2020-21 was the sixth edition of the multi-national handball competition between Belgium and the Netherlands.

KEMBIT-LIONS won for the second time the BENE-League.

Clubs

Rwgular season

Standings

Results

Final Four

Semifinals

Final

References

External links 
 Official website

BENE-League Handball
2021–22 domestic handball leagues